The Kingco Athletic Conference is a high school athletics conference in King County, Washington, part of the Washington Interscholastic Activities Association (WIAA).  Its 17 members are in SeaKing District II, which includes Seattle and east King County, and includes schools in the three highest classification levels, 4A, 3A and 2A.

Members

4A members
10 schools, competing in two divisions

^ switched divisions for the 2012–13 school year

3A Members

2A Members

Sports

References

External links
 
 Seaking District II official website
 Washington Interscholastic Activities Association official website

High school sports conferences and leagues in the United States
 
Sports in King County, Washington